John Kammytzes was a senior military commander of the Empire of Nicaea, with the rank of megas hetaireiarches.

His early life is unknown, but he was a member of the notable aristocratic Kam[m]ytzes clan and a relative of Manuel Kammytzes, who served as protostrator under the Angelos emperors. He is only mentioned by George Akropolites in ca. 1224, when the inhabitants of Adrianople sent envoys to Nicaea, calling upon the emperor John III Vatatzes to liberate them from Latin rule. Vatatzes sent Kammytzes, along with the protostrator John Ises, at the head of an army. The city was easily captured, but soon after in late 1224 or early 1225, the ruler of Epirus, Theodore Komnenos Doukas, a rival of Vatatzes who also claimed the imperial title, appeared before the city. Theodore won over the inhabitants, and Ises and Kammytzes agreed to leave the city on guarantee of safe passage. Kammytzes is said to have infuriated Theodore when he failed to dismount and do homage to him as emperor as he was leaving the city, and the Epirote ruler insulted him. As a reward for this display of loyalty, Vatatzes named Kammytzes megas hetaireiarches.

References

Sources

 

13th-century Byzantine people
Byzantine generals
People of the Empire of Nicaea
History of Edirne
John
Megaloi hetaireiarchai